Rubén Oscar Capria (born 6 January 1970, in General Belgrano) is an Argentine former professional footballer who played as a midfielder in Argentina, Mexico, Ecuador, Chile and Uruguay.

Nicknamed "El Mago", because of his exquisite technique, Capria has played for six clubs in Argentina as well as Cruz Azul in Mexico, Barcelona Sporting Club in Ecuador, Universidad Católica in Chile and Peñarol in Uruguay.

Honours

Club
 Newell's Old Boys
Primera Division Argentina: Apertura 2004

External links
 Argentine Primera statistics  
 Clarin news article 
 Player profile on the Peñarol website 

1970 births
Living people
Sportspeople from Buenos Aires Province
Argentine footballers
Association football midfielders
Estudiantes de La Plata footballers
Racing Club de Avellaneda footballers
Cruz Azul footballers
Chacarita Juniors footballers
Club Atlético Lanús footballers
Unión de Santa Fe footballers
Barcelona S.C. footballers
Club Deportivo Universidad Católica footballers
Newell's Old Boys footballers
Peñarol players
Argentine Primera División players
Expatriate footballers in Chile
Expatriate footballers in Mexico
Expatriate footballers in Ecuador
Expatriate footballers in Uruguay